Henry Joy McCracken's GFC Moneymore is a Gaelic Athletic Association club based in Moneymore, County Londonderry, Northern Ireland. The club is a member of Derry GAA and currently caters for Gaelic football. The club is named after the 18th-century Irish republican leader Henry Joy McCracken.

Underage teams play in the South Derry league and championships. Moneymore have won the Derry Intermediate Football Championship once and the Derry Junior Football Championship twice.

Gaelic football
Moneymore fields Gaelic football teams at Reserve and Senior levels. Underage teams (U8, U10, U12, U14, U16 and Minor) are amalgamated with Desetmartin GAC and form the Callan Gaels team. Sides up to U-12s play in South Derry league and championships, from U-14 upwards teams compete in All-Derry competitions.

Ladies' Gaelic football
Moneymore ladies play together with An Lúb players in the Ardtrea team. The team also draws players from Ballinderry, Lissan, Ógra Colmcille and other South Derry clubs along the border with County Tyrone.

History
There was a presence of Gaelic games in Moneymore in the early 1900s. O'Cahan Moneymore played in the Cookstown and District Football League in 1911. Moneymore won the South Derry Handball League in 1991 and 1912. The next records of O'Cahan's were in 1934 when they played in the South Derry League, but lasted only one season, before competing again in 1938 and 1939. The club played as Henry Joy McCracken's in 1945, before becoming defunct decades later.

McCracken's reformed in 1976 and chose to wear black and amber colours. The first President was Charlie Teague, an old O'Cahan's clubman. Managed by Brendan O'Neill and Patsy Breen, the club's first major success came in 1984 when they won the Derry Intermediate Football Championship. McCracken's won the 1995 Derry Junior Football Championship.

Honours

Senior
Derry Intermediate Football Championship: 1
1984 runner-up 2001
Derry Junior Football Championship: 2
1995 2014 runner up 1999
Derry Football League Division 3: 3
1995 1999 2014
Derry Senior Football League Division 1B: 1
2001 topped league in 2002 but did not win league as play off system was used

Reserve
Graham Cup 2
1978 2014

Minor
(Runners up) South Derry Minor B Championship 
1997
 Derry Minor B Championship
2017 (Callan Gaels)
 Derry Minor B League
2017 (Callan Gaels)

Under-16
Derry Under-16 Football Championship: 1
1963
South Derry Under-16 Football Championship: 1
1963 runner up 1994
 South Derry Minor B Football League
 1998.
 Derry Minors C Football league and Football Championship
 2017
 Derry Under-16 C Football League
 2017
 Derry Under-16 C Football Championship 1
 2017

Handball
South Derry Handball League: 2
1911, 1912

See also
Derry Intermediate Football Championship
List of Gaelic games clubs in Derry

External links
Henry Joy McCracken GFC

References

Gaelic games clubs in County Londonderry
Gaelic football clubs in County Londonderry